The Inner Healing Movement refers to a grassroots lay counseling movement among Christians of various denominations. It engages the use of prayer, forgiveness, repentance, rejecting lies and replacing them with truth, and processing painful memories to bring emotional and spiritual healing.

History and description

Practitioners in the Inner Healing Movement may not always have formal training in counseling or psychology. Christian psychologist and academic Fernando Garzon views this in a positive light, saying: "it may serve people who might not get help otherwise, cannot afford professional therapy, do not wish to use insurance, or have access to counseling limited by managed care. Others belong to churches in which the pastor is either are not trained, not interested, or not available (due to having too many other pastoral duties) to meet the needs for pastoral counseling. Still others simply may trust on lay people, whom they know, more than a therapist, whom they do not know. In addition, the training itself may benefit the lay counselors spiritually and emotionally."

How the Inner Healing Movement started 

Agnes Sanford (1897–1982) is considered to be the mother of the inner healing movement, and along with her husband, founded The Agnes Sanford School of Pastoral Care in 1958. She was the daughter of a Presbyterian missionary in China, and the wife of an Episcopal rector.

In the early 1900s, she was part of the healing revivals and charismatic renewal in the United States. As she saw miraculous healings in the physical, with big tent meetings ministering to large groups, she began to see the need for more individualized ministry and addressing emotional and spiritual wounds as well as the physical. She worked with churches as early as the 1930s teaching them to pray for mental and emotional issues before inner healing was even a term. Her first book, The Healing Light, is considered classic in its field. Agnes was the mother of Jungian analyst Jack Sanford.

The inner healing movement is also often compared and associated with Inner Healing and Healing of Memories. Other people who feature prominently in its history are Ruth Carter Stapleton, Leanne Payne, Francis MacNutt and Charles Fillmore. A number of organizations are currently active, including Elijah House, Ministries of Pastoral Care, and Sozo Ministries. Another important part of Christian Inner Healing Methods is the active involvement of God in the healing work taking place.  The belief that God heals both physical and mental problems is a long-standing Christian belief, originating in traditional Jewish beliefs.

Key figures in the Inner Healing Movement 
John and Paula Sandford, the founders of Elijah House, were heavily influenced by Agnes Sanford (no relation) and served to clarify and further her teachings. In 1958 the Sandfords encountered the charismatic revivals and were filled with the Holy Spirit. After several years of learning in ministry, the Sandfords founded Elijah House in 1975. Their ministry has grown over the decades and continues to thrive both in the United States and internationally through their partner ministries.  Paula Sandford passed away in 2012 and John followed in 2018.  Elijah House ministries is carried on by their son Mark and other ministry partners they gained over the years.

Leanne Payne is considered the mother of listening prayer. In the late '80s and early '90s she released several books that teach listening prayer and how it can be applied to a variety of issues. Rusty Rustenbach is the most prominent current teacher of this method. His book A Guide for Listening and Inner Healing Prayer draws from Payne's work and leads the reader through personal inner healing and journaling.  Many inner healing approaches now incorporate some aspect of listening prayer. While the listening prayer approach is rather basic, it was revolutionary for its time. The idea that you could listen in prayer and hear from God, not just by reading scripture, but hear real relevant answers to the deep hurts and questions you carry, was a paradigm-shifting concept in the church.

Ed Smith, a pastoral counselor, founded Theophostic Prayer Ministry in 1996. In his work with clients Smith became frustrated seeing his clients get better at symptom management, but never finding lasting change and the freedom they longed for.  Ultimately Smith realized that it wasn't just the past traumas of his clients that were holding them back, it was the beliefs they had come under in light of those traumas. These lenses of belief were shading everything in the clients’ lives and driving the relentless emotional pain and struggle. As Smith determined, “If the past is the problem, then there is no present solution. were true that our past is the root of our current problem then there is no remedy, since the past cannot be changed. However, if our current trouble is rooted in what we currently believe -even though we learned it in an earlier life experience- the belief is changeable even though the past is not.”

Yet simply knowing the truth wasn't setting his clients free either. One day Smith had a client that was having strong memories of a past abuse, she was wrestling with the belief that it was all her fault, even though she knew that wasn't true.  Out of ideas, Smith prayed out-loud, “Jesus is there anything you want her to know about this memory?” After a few moments the woman reported that Jesus had met her in that memory and told her it was not her fault. Hearing it straight from God is what she needed for her head and heart to finally agree on the truth and release the lies she had believed. After this client session, Smith began to try this technique with other clients, asking Jesus to show them where he was in their memories of trauma and letting him tell them the truth they needed to hear.

This process became the core tool of Theophostic and the foundation for the method Smith developed and trained others in. The name Theophostic comes from the Greek words theos meaning God, and phos meaning light. The goal of Theophostic is to shine God's light on our dark and hurting places.

In 2016 Theophostic rebranded as Transformation Prayer Ministry and totally redid their training material and re-launched it as online training. They changed names to emphasize the transformation clients go through when God's truth lights up their dark places. And streamlined the training to make it easier to learn.

Dawna DeSilva and Teresa Liebscher are the founders of Sozo ministry, developed in the late 90s. In 1997 they learned a deliverance tool from Argentina called the Four Doors. As they served together on the prayer line at Bethel Church in Redding, California, they began experimenting with this tool and found that these four doors that the demonic can gain access to our lives through were a very effective tool for releasing inner healing even in short prayer sessions.

Over the years they picked up more tools such as the Father Ladder and more advanced tools from teachings by Aiko Hormann and their own personal discovery as they have worked with people over the years.

“In 1998 other churches and organizations requested the Sozo Ministry to share what God had started. Thus, the Bethel Sozo Ministry started traveling to train and equip other churches and organizations to start their own Sozo Ministry. We have traveled international and to numerous states for this training and equipping.

In 2005, the Bethel Sozo Ministry so covered the globe, that the International Bethel Sozo Organization was created to aid and support all the Bethel Sozo Ministry Teams around the world.” - From the Bethel Sozo website

The Bethel Sozo network now has practitioners in over twenty-two countries and in most US states.

Chester and Betsy Kylstra founded Restoring the Foundations in 1992. While they were working in ministry God revealed to them four areas of healing that needed to be addressed to bring true freedom. These four areas became the fundamental structures of Restoring the Foundations. By 2000, the Kylstras had more than sixteen team members ministering along with them and in 2001 they established the Healing House Network to expand their training and ministry covering. In 2004 they purchased an inn in North Carolina that became their headquarters and training center, where they also offered retreats.

In 2014 the Kylstras transitioned the ministry leadership to their successors, Lee and Cindi Whitman. The Whitman's have continued the mission and vision of Restoring the Foundations and in 2018 moved the headquarters to Nashville, TN.

Timothy Davis started Cleansing Streams in the late 80s first as a deliverance and discipleship ministry out of Church on the Way. It began as a couples Bible study but the requests for it were so great they expanded it into a group class format. They wanted to avoid pitfalls of previous deliverance ministries. And so discipleship was always the focus along with deliverance ministry.

Over time it evolved from just a deliverance ministry into an inner healing ministry as well, gaining insight from RTF ministry. Jack Hayford, lead pastor at Church on the Way became a prominent supporter of Cleansing Streams and still sits on their board. In the late '90s Davis experienced a personal breakdown that resulted in him parting ways with Cleansing Streams. The ministry continued under the leadership of Hayford and the Church on the Way and is now led by Chris Hayward and his wife, Karen.

Dr. Karl Lehman developed the Immanuel Approach over decades of working with clients. As a psychiatrist, he has worked hard to integrate Christian faith-based approaches with scientifically backed psychological and neurological research. In the early 90s, Dr. Lehman was very simply praying with clients and inviting Jesus into the counseling process. In 1995 he learned about trauma processing from EMDR (a trauma counseling approach). He began incorporating some tools from EMDR with his counseling and prayer tools and gained a greater agility in troubleshooting when a client would get stuck.

In 1998 Dr. Lehman learned about Theophostic and was impressed with how it combined the foundational principles of everything he knew at the time about trauma processing. He began to incorporate tools from Theophostic into his counseling. As he worked with clients using these new tools, Dr. Lehman found that there was a cap on the capacity for some clients to engage with their trauma memories and get free. Despite the client's desire to process the memories they often would get stuck and either shut down when they got to a certain point or struggle to connect with the memory at all.

In the early 2000s, frustrated and longing to see his clients totally free, Dr. Lehman prayed asking God to show him what he was missing. It then dawned on him that this whole time the focus had been on the traumatic memories themselves and then bringing Jesus into them. He wondered what would happen if instead he began the session focused on Jesus and made the goal of each session connecting with Jesus and removing anything blocking that connection, rather than having the primary goal of removing the trauma. He found this approach to be extremely effective and developed into what is now known as the Immanuel Approach.

In the 1990s, Father Andrew, an evangelical episcopal priest and licensed social worker, began developing tools for healing the brokenhearted and in 2010 officially launched HeartSync as a ministry and began training others. In 2018 HeartSync ministries established their official training requirements for being certified as a HeartSync minister.

Teresa Liebscher, co-founder of Sozo, founded Shabar ministry in 2002. It developed out of the Sozo ministry when they had clients that struggled to hold onto their healing despite extensive inner healing work. It gets its name from Isaiah 61:1 from the Hebrew word Shabar, meaning “broken-hearted” or “shattered”. Their mission is to bring knowledge, hope, and wholeness to “shattered” individuals.

Both Shabar and HeartSync are designed to work with “broken-hearted” or “shattered” individuals – what the mental health world may identify as dissociative identity disorder or multiple personality disorder. (DID and MPD are mental health diagnosis terms. We do not diagnose or treat mental health issues in inner healing.) Both of these approaches work by guiding the client to speak with God and allow various parts of themselves to join the conversation.

Mind-body work with inner healing 
More recent inner healing models have combined mind-body work with traditional inner healing prayer structures. Such models incorporate meridian-based energy healing from a Christian perspective and within the bounds of traditional Evangelical theology.

Splankna is a model developed by Christian professional counselor, Sarah Thiessen. Starting in 1997, Thiessen had several encounters with chiropractic and alternative healing that sent her on a researching journey.  At first she was concerned these methods of healing were New Age, but as God kept bumping her into it, she finally decided to see what he was trying to show her.  Through a seven-year process of development Thiessen got trained in TFT, EFT, and another energy healing model called NET (neuro-emotive technique) which is primarily used by chiropractors.  With these trainings she examined what was good that worked because God made it to work, and what were views attached to what worked that could be stripped away and replaced with God's truth about it. This journey of development resulted in what is now called Splankna – the first Christian approach to energy healing. In the early 2000s Thiessen began training others in Splankna and the Splankna Therapy Institute now has over 2,000 practitioners trained worldwide.

Christian EFT practitioner Sherrie Rice Smith has written several books on using EFT from a Christian perspective and has trained many EFT practitioners in this faith based approach. She is a pioneer in Christian approaches to mind-body work and her books provide a scientific basis for EFT as well as ways to incorporate scripture with tapping.

Captive Thought Therapy (CTT) was developed in 2016, by Leah Lesesne, an inner healing practitioner with a counseling masters. Lesesne started out in the inner healing world with the Elijah House School of Prayer Ministry, and got trained in Splankna and TFT as she completed her master's degree. After working for a few years in the mental health world of counseling, Lesesne became frustrated with the current options for helping clients with trauma and the lack of inner healing applications even in Christian settings. She knew that Splankna, EFT, and TFT had solutions that worked, but she saw how Christians sometimes rejected these models of healing, even Splankna a Christian approach, often because of concerns around the use of muscle testing (a method of applied kinesiology to allow the subconscious to confirm emotional content). While she saw value to muscle testing, Lesesne saw the opportunity for a listening prayer approach to be used instead to identify emotional content. She began using the information she knew from TFT and Splankna about the meridian system combined with listening prayer to walk her clients through inner healing that addresses body, mind, and spirit and found just as much success with this method as with using the muscle testing.

Concerns about memory work 
Theophostic Prayer Ministry (TPM) techniques and other inner healing models that incorporate memory work have become popular. However, some have concerns about these approaches with some of their underlying principles being compared with those of Recovered Memory Therapy (RMT). In the Journal of Psychology and Theology, Spring 2004, Christian psychologist David Entwistle summarized some concerns associated with Theophostic methods:  'TPM follows in the lineage of "healing of memory" techniques, though it departs from that lineage in a number of important respects.  Numerous concerns exist surrounding insufficient attempts to ground TPM in biblical concepts; inadequate and often flawed explanations of basic psychological processes; dubious claims about the prevalence of DID, SRA, and demonic activity; estimates of traumatic abuse that exceed empirical findings; and the failure to sufficiently appreciate the possibility of iatrogenic memory contamination.'<ref>David N. Entwistle Spring 2004, Shedding light on Theophostic Ministry 1: practice issues, "Journal of Psychology and Theology".</ref>

TPM and others, such as De Silva and Liebscher of Sozo ministry, denounce the use of memory recovery as described in the above concerns. Practitioners of their methods that have strayed from the standard teaching seem to be the source of these concerning practices.

See also
 Elijah House 
 Ellel Ministries International

References

 Books 
J.D. King (2017), Regeneration: A Complete History of Healing in the Christian Church Volume Two, Christos Publishing 
K. Lehman (2016) The Immanuel Approach: for Emotional healing and for life.  Evanston IL: Immanuel Publishing
Agnes Sanford (1974), The Healing Power of the Bible, Hodder & Stoughton 
Ruth Carter Stapleton (1979), The Experience of Inner Healing, Bantam Books 
Charles Fillmore (1995), Prosperity, Book Tree 
Leanne Payne, The Healing Presence, Baker books  
Rusty Rustenbach (2011), A Guide for Listening and Inner-Healing Prayer: Meeting God in the Broken Places, Nav Press  
Edward Smith (2004), Healing Life's Hurts Through Theophostic Prayer: Let The Light Of Christ Set You Free From Lifelong Fears, Shame, False Guilt, Anxiety And Emotional Pain'', Regal Books  

Christian movements
Counseling organizations
Charismatic and Pentecostal Christianity